Vicina  may refer to:

 Vicina (town), a former Genoese port on the Lower Danube, in modern Romania
 Agave vicina, a plant species in the genus Agave
 Amphiodia vicina, a brittle star species in the genus Amphiodia
 Caerostris vicina, a spider species in the genus Caerostris
 Calliphora vicina, a bottle fly species
 Cheilosia vicina, a hoverfly species found in Great Britain
 Meliphaga vicina, a species of bird in the family Meliphagidae endemic to Papua New Guinea
 Paa vicina, a frog species
 Perenniporia vicina, a fungus species in the genus Perenniporia
 Philoponella vicina, an uloborid spider species
 Phylloxiphia vicina, a moth species in the genus Phylloxiphia
 Poria vicina, a plant pathogen species
 Pterotricha vicina, a ground spider species in the genus Pterotricha
Carpatolechia, a genus of moth for which the synonym "Vicina" has been used